Isovaleraldehyde organic compound, also known as 3-methylbutanal, with the formula (CH3)2CHCH2CHO. It is an aldehyde, a colorless liquid at STP, and found in low concentrations in many types of food. It can be produced commercially and is used as a reagent for the production of pharmaceuticals and pesticides.

Synthesis
Synthetic routes for the production of isovaleraldehyde vary. One method is by the hydroformylation of isobutene:

A small amount of 2,2-dimethylpropanal ( side product is also generated.

Another method of production involves the isomerization of 3-methylbut-3-en-1-ol using CuO–ZnO as a catalyst. A mixture of 3-methylbut-3-en-1-ol and 3-methylbut-2-en-1-ol may also be used. These starting materials are obtained from a reaction between isobutene and formaldehyde:
CH3CH3CCH2 + CH2O  → (CH3)2CHCH2CHO

Finally, in beer the compound is produced via a reaction between the amino acid leucine and reductones in the malt.

Occurrences and uses

As it can be derived from leucine, the occurrence of isovaleraldehyde is not limited to beer. The compound has found to be a flavor component in many different types of foods. It is described as having a malty flavor and has been found in cheese, coffee, chicken, fish, chocolate, olive oil, and tea.
 
The compound is used as a reactant in the synthesis of a number of compounds.  Notably it is used to synthesize 2,3-dimethylbut-2-ene, and is then converted to 2,3-dimethylbutane-2,3-diol and methyl tert-butyl ketone, better known as pinacolone. Pinacolone itself is then used in synthesis for number of pesticides. Additionally, a range of pharmaceuticals, such as butizide, are synthesized from isovaleraldehyde and its corresponding acid.  It is a common reagent or building block in organic synthesis.

References

Flavors
Alkanals